Tristan Ryan Nydam (born 6 November 1999) is a former professional footballer who played as a midfielder or left back. Nydam represented England at under-18 and under-19 levels.

Club career

Ipswich Town
Nydam was born in Zimbabwe and moved to England with his family when he was only 10, growing up in Colchester. He became a schoolboy player with Ipswich Town in 2008, before signing a two-year scholarship at Town in July 2016, and then went on to sign his first two-year professional contract in November 2016. He went on to make his full senior debut in the 2–0 win over Luton Town in the first round of the League Cup on 8 August 2017. In November 2017, Nydam signed a new contract with Ipswich until 2021, with the option of an additional year extension. He made 20 appearances during his debut season for the Ipswich first-team.

St Johnstone (loan)
On 28 August 2018, Nydam signed a loan deal through to January 2019 with Scottish Premiership side St Johnstone. He made his debut for St Johnstone as a sub in a 2–1 away win over Hamilton Academical on 1 September. Nydam found his first team chances limited during his loan spell in Scotland, only making 5 appearances before being recalled in January following the end of his loan deal.

Return to Ipswich Town
Nydam made 1 substitute appearance for the first-team during the 2018–19 season after returning from loan in January, coming on as a substitute in a 0–2 loss away at Brentford on 10 April 2019.

In July 2019 he broke his ankle during a pre-season Friendly away at Notts County, ruling him out for 6 months.

On 10 April 2021, two years to the day since his last competitive appearance, Nydam made his return from injury as a second-half substitute in a home match against Milton Keynes Dons. On 10 May 2021, Ipswich announced that Nydam would be released following the end of his contract.

Retirement
On 20 March 2022, Nydam announced his retirement from football at the age of 22.

International career
Nydam made his debut for the England under-18 national team in a 2–1 win against Qatar on 24 March 2017.

He was named in the England under-19 squad for friendlies against Poland and Germany in September 2017. He made his debut in the game against Poland, starting the game in a 7–1 win.

Career statistics

Honours
Individual
Ipswich Town Young Player of the Year: 2016–17

References

External links

1999 births
Living people
Sportspeople from Harare
Sportspeople from Colchester
English footballers
Association football midfielders
Ipswich Town F.C. players
St Johnstone F.C. players
English Football League players
Scottish Professional Football League players
England youth international footballers
Zimbabwean emigrants to the United Kingdom